Kolpnyansky District is an administrative and municipal district (raion), one of the twenty-four in Oryol Oblast, Russia. It is located in the southeast of the oblast. Its administrative center is the urban locality (an urban-type settlement) of Kolpna. Population: 15,453 (2010 Census);  The population of Kolpna accounts for 42.8% of the district's total population.

References

Notes

Sources

Districts of Oryol Oblast